John Joseph Fitzpatrick (October 12, 1918 – July 15, 2006) was a Canadian-born prelate of the Roman Catholic Church.  He served as an auxiliary bishop of the Archdiocese of Miami in Florida from 1968 to 1971 and as the third bishop of the Diocese of Brownsville in Texas from 1971 to 1991.

Fitzpatrick was described as a strong advocate for the poor and for refugees.

Biography

Early life 
John Fitzpatrick was born in Trenton, Ontario, Canada on October 12, 1918.  When he was age five, his family moved to Buffalo, New York.  He attended Catholic schools throughout high school.  He went to Rome to study for the priesthood, but was forced to return to the United States due to its entry into World War II.After the war, Fitzpatrick returned to Rome to complete his studies.

Priesthood 
Fitzpatrick was ordained a priest by Bishop John Aloysius Duffy for the Diocese of Buffalo on December 13, 1942 when he was 24 years old.  After his ordination, he went to Florida to serve as a military chaplain.  He was incardinated, or transferred, in 1948 to the Diocese of St Augustine in Florida, then in 1958 was incardinated again, this time to the Archdiocese of Miami.

Auxiliary Bishop of Miami 
Fitzpatrick was appointed by Pope Paul VI as auxiliary bishop of the Archdiocese of Miami and titular bishop of Cenae on June 24, 1968. On August 28, 1968, he was consecrated a bishop by Archbishop Coleman F. Carroll; his co-consecrators were Bishop Joseph Durick and Archbishop Joseph Bernardin.

Bishop of Brownsville 
On April 27, 1971, Fitzpatrick was appointed by Paul VI as the third bishop of the Diocese of Brownsville.  He was installed on May 27, 1971.  In 1982, Fitzpatrick opened Casa Oscar Romero in Brownsville, named after the murdered Salvadorian archbishop, Oscar Arnulfo Romero.  It served as a shelter for refugees coming across the Mexican border into the United States.  He eventually closed the shelter after repeated complaints from federal judges that he was violating US immigration law.  Fitzpatrick set up a different shelter and even opened his own garage to refugees.

As bishop, he set up an extensive program to train lay people to assume roles within the diocese.  He also established diocese radio and TV stations.

Retirement and legacy 
On November 30, 1991, Pope John Paul II accepted Fitzpatrick's resignation as bishop of the Diocese of Brownsville.  After the death of his replacement, Bishop Enrique San Pedro, in 1994, Fitzpatrick served as apostolic administrator for nearly a year until the appointment of Bishop Raymundo Peña in 1995.  In May 1994, Fitzpatrick testified in court on behalf of Stacey Lynn Merkt, a Catholic lay worker accused of illegally bringing two Salvadoran refugees into the United States.  He said that aiding refugees was in accordance with the laws of man and of God

John Fitzpatrick died in Brownsville on July 15, 2006 at age 87.

See also

References

External links 
 Roman Catholic Archdiocese of Miami
 Roman Catholic Diocese of Brownsville 
 Tyler Morning Telegraph obituary

Roman Catholic Archdiocese of Miami
Roman Catholic Ecclesiastical Province of Galveston–Houston
1918 births
2006 deaths
Canadian emigrants to the United States
Religious leaders from Texas
Religious leaders from Florida
20th-century Roman Catholic bishops in the United States